This is a list of songs that reached number one on the Billboard Mainstream Top 40 (or Pop Songs) chart in 2020.

During 2020, a total of 15 singles hit number-one on the charts.

Chart history

See also
2020 in American music

References

External links
Current Billboard Pop Songs chart

Billboard charts
Mainstream Top 40 2020
United States Mainstream Top 40